Lillian Malkina (born July 14, 1938) is a Soviet, Czech and Russian actress.

Early life 
Malkina was born in Tallinn. From childhood, she attended drama club, where she trained with Vladimir Korenev, Larisa Luzhina, Vitali Konyayev. In 1960 she graduated from the Saint Petersburg State Theatre Arts Academy and became an actress for Tallinn Russian Drama. She appeared in theaters in Leningrad and Moscow. She played comedic roles.

Since 1992, she has lived and worked in Prague, in the Czech Republic. She appears in European cinema and Czech television series, playing in five theaters simultaneously.

Filmography 
 1965 —  The Big Cat's Tale as episode
 1970 —  Attention, Turtle! as Vova's grandmother
1977 —  Steppe as Rosa
1978 —  Leaving — leave as Nina Grigoryevna
 1981 —  Where did Fomenko? as Korobkina
1987 —  Island of Lost Ships as Frida
1989 —  Rouen Virgin Nicknamed Pyshka as old nun
1991 —  Khraniteli  as Lobelia Sackville-Baggins (Lyubeliya Lyakoshel)
1992 —  White Clothes as Professor Pobiyaho
 1994 —  Giorgino as Mrs.Vennepeyn
 1996  —  The Adventures of Pinocchio as  woman in laundry
 1997 —  Kolya as Tamara, Kolya's grandmother 
 1999  — Le sourire du Clown as  bag lady
 2000 —  Geisterjäger John Sinclair as nurse
 2001 —  On Behalf of Baron as Ethel
 2006 —  Ro(c)k podvraťáků as Radek's grandmother  
 2006 —  Fascination of Evil as nurse  
 2007 —  Hostel: Part II  as make-up woman
 2007 —  Grindhouse as   the Grandmother (segment 'Thanksgiving')
 2008 —  Pani Malkina —  Czech Ranevskaya as herself
 2008 —  Taková normální rodinka as Babicka 
 2008 —  Ošklivka Katka as episode
 2010 —  Občanský průkaz as Míta's Grandmother 
 2013 —  	Mirrors as episode
 2015 —  	Vánocní Kamenák as Doorkeeper Muzíková
 2020 —  	Hello, grandma! (voice)
 2022 —  	Stárí není pro sraby as  Lounová

References

External links
 

1938 births
Living people
Soviet actresses
20th-century Russian actresses
21st-century Russian actresses
Czech actresses
Actresses from Tallinn